The 1910 Cincinnati Reds season was a season in American baseball. The Reds finished 5th in the National League with a record of 75–79.

Offseason 
On January 20, the Reds traded pitchers Bob Ewing and Ad Brennan to the Philadelphia Phillies, receiving pitchers Frank Corridon and Harry Coveleski.  Corridon had a record of 11–9 with a 2.11 ERA in 27 games, while Coveleski had a 6–10 record with a 2.74 ERA in 24 games in the 1909 season.

Corridon would not stay with Cincinnati, as he was traded a couple of weeks later, with second baseman Miller Huggins and outfielder Rebel Oakes to the St. Louis Cardinals, getting pitcher Fred Beebe and infielder Alan Storke.  Beebe was the Cardinals ace in 1909, going 15–21 with a 2.82 ERA in 44 games.  As a rookie in 1906, Beebe led the National League in strikeouts with 171.

Regular season 
The Reds were led offensively by outfielder Mike Mitchell, who in 156 games, hit .286 with a team high five home runs an 86 RBI.  Fellow outfielder Bob Bescher hit .250, but had a team high 70 stolen bases.  First baseman Dick Hoblitzell continued to become a star, hitting .278 with four home runs and 70 RBI in 155 games.  Catcher Larry McLean had a very solid season, batting .298 with two home runs and 71 RBI in 127 games.

The pitching staff was anchored by George Suggs, who led the Reds with a 20–12 record with a 2.40 ERA in 35 games, in which he threw 23 complete games.  Harry Gaspar had a very good season, as he went 15–17 with a 2.59 ERA in 48 games in a team high 275 innings pitched.  Jack Rowan was a solid third starter, going 14–13 with a 2.93 ERA in 42 games.  Newly acquired Fred Beebe finished 12–14 with a 3.07 ERA in 35 games in his first season with the team.

Season summary 
After a poor 3–6 start to the season in their first nine games, the Reds rebounded and went 13–5 in their next 18 games, improving their record to 16–11, good for second place in the National League, only a half game behind the Pittsburgh Pirates for first place.  It would be the closest the team would get to first place, as the club fell out of the pennant race as the season went on.  Cincinnati struggled to a 75–79 record, finishing 29 games behind the first place Chicago Cubs.

Season standings

Record vs. opponents

Notable transactions 
 June 15, 1910: Bob Spade was selected off waivers from the Reds by the St. Louis Browns.

Roster

Player stats

Batting

Starters by position 
Note: Pos = Position; G = Games played; AB = At bats; H = Hits; Avg. = Batting average; HR = Home runs; RBI = Runs batted in

Other batters 
Note: G = Games played; AB = At bats; H = Hits; Avg. = Batting average; HR = Home runs; RBI = Runs batted in

Pitching

Starting pitchers 
Note: G = Games pitched; IP = Innings pitched; W = Wins; L = Losses; ERA = Earned run average; SO = Strikeouts

Other pitchers 
Note: G = Games pitched; IP = Innings pitched; W = Wins; L = Losses; ERA = Earned run average; SO = Strikeouts

Relief pitchers 
Note: G = Games pitched; W = Wins; L = Losses; SV = Saves; ERA = Earned run average; SO = Strikeouts

Notes

References 
1910 Cincinnati Reds season at Baseball Reference

Cincinnati Reds seasons
Cincinnati Reds season
Cincinnati Reds